Raja County is an administrative area in Lol State, South Sudan.

Geography
Raja area is located in western part of South Sudan, it is bordering Sudan from north in Radom and Fifi in Hufrt-anahas (international border) in south it has border with Wau state in Khor-Hajar, while in the east the official border is Bora stream.  In the west is bordering Republic Centre Africa, 
The total area is approximately 25.460 Kilometer squares.
   
Raja is one of the components of Bahr el Ghazal; it was a colonial province that covered the western Nile basin in the south of (Turco-Egyptian Sudan).

Historical administrative points
At the start of 1956, Raja County was a full district, which was when the Republic of Sudan had gained its independence.

1983: In the period of President Nimeri Raja county (Mudriya) was established. It was when South Sudan was divided into three regions with the regional government in Juba.
1994: President Bashir divided Sudan into twenty six states (sixteen in the north and ten in south). Raja was a county under Western Bahr el-Ghazal state.
2015: Raja County was separated from western Bahr el-Ghazal and two counties from Awiel was annexed to it to form what called Lol state, since then the situation remained stagnant.

Ethnic groups
As of 2013, ethnic groups reported in Raja County were Balanda, Banda, Buja, Feroghe, Kara, Kresh, Shat, and Yulu.

Raja County is a home for Fertit ethnic groups namely:
Niagugule, Indri, Togoyo, Forge, Bandalla (in the east, north, and centre)
Zande, Balanda Viri, Chatt, Banda, Mangayat, Kresh-Uruo (in the south)
Kresh, Yulu, Benga, Kara, Aja (in the west)

Each group from the above mentioned have different native tongues, but they live together throughout the history of this area.

References

Counties of South Sudan